The discography of American heavy metal band Chimaira consists of seven studio albums, two extended plays, eleven singles, two video albums and thirteen music videos. Chimaira originated in Cleveland, Ohio, composed of vocalist Mark Hunter, guitarists Jason Hager and Rob Arnold, bassist Jim LaMarca, drummer Andols Herrick and programmer Chris Spicuzza. Hager was replaced by Matt DeVries in 2001. Chimaira's first release was an extended play, This Present Darkness, which sold 10,000 copies. After signing to Roadrunner Records, the band's debut studio album, Pass Out of Existence, was released in August 2001. A second studio album, The Impossibility of Reason, followed in 2003, debuting and peaking at number 117 on the Billboard 200. Herrick was replaced by drummer Kevin Talley, formerly of Misery Index, in 2004. A video album, The Dehumanizing Process, arrived later that year, documenting the writing and recording process behind The Impossibility of Reason. Chimaira released a self-titled album in August 2005, which peaked at number 74 on the Billboard 200. After an internal crisis due to pressure from the label for a new release, the band moved on from Roadrunner and signed a new deal with Ferret Music. In early 2006, Herrick rejoined the band and Chimaira recorded their fourth studio album Resurrection, which appeared in early March 2007. Resurrection peaked at number 42 on the Billboard 200.

Albums

Studio albums

Video albums

Extended plays

Singles

Guest appearances

Music videos

References

External links
Official website
Chimaira at AllMusic

Heavy metal group discographies
Discographies of American artists